"Armed and Extremely Dangerous" is a 1973 song by American girl group First Choice from their album Armed and Extremely Dangerous. It is their highest charting single in the US & is arguably the band's most well-known song.

The song became a Top 20 hit in the United Kingdom.  It reached the Top 40 in the United States.

Track listing

7" Single 

A - Armed & Extremely Dangerous - 2:49

B - Gonna Keep On Lovin' Him - 2:44

Maxi Single 
1 - Armed & Extremely Dangerous (Full Intention Radio Edit) - 3:36

2 - Armed & Extremely Dangerous (Blowout Express Soul Mix) - 4:30

3 - Armed & Extremely Dangerous (Original version) - 2:46

4 - Armed & Extremely Dangerous (Full Intention Vocal) - 6:08

5 - Armed & Extremely Dangerous (Black Science Restoration Vocal) - 6:37

6 - Armed & Extremely Dangerous (Cevin's Classic Club) - 7:06

7 - Armed & Extremely Dangerous (South Beach Cool Out Jazz Mix) - 8:15

Charts

References

External links 
 Lyrics of this song
 Page on Discogs
 

1973 songs
1973 singles
First Choice songs
Songs written by Allan Felder
Songs written by Norman Harris (musician)
Philly Groove Records singles